This is a list of New Hampshire covered bridges, old, new, and restored. There are 58 historic wooden covered bridges currently standing and assigned official numbers by the U.S. state of New Hampshire. There are additional covered bridges extant in the state, some of which are on private property and not accessible to the public. The newest covered bridge known to have been constructed in the state is the Chester Covered Bridge, built in 2011.

Standing covered bridges

Some bridges go by two or more names; this list uses the name posted on the bridge.

Lost covered bridges
This is a partial list of other covered bridges that once stood in New Hampshire.

Notable

Bedell Covered Bridge (Haverhill, destroyed 1979)
County Farm Bridge (Dover, burned 1981)
Goffstown Covered Railroad Bridge (Goffstown, burned 1976)
New Henniker Bridge (West Hopkinton, dismantled 1936)

Others

 Androscoggin River Covered Bridge (Errol)
Clear Stream Covered Bridge (Errol)
Fields Bridge / Seaverns Bridge (Merrimack)
Runnells Bridge (Hollis)
Turkey Hill Bridge (Merrimack)

Notes

References

Further reading

External links 

 Interactive Google Map of New Hampshire Covered Bridges

NH Division of Historical Resources
National Society for the Preservation of Covered Bridges
Interactive map of bridges in New Hampshire from New Hampshire Department of Transportation

Covered bridges
Covered bridges

Bridges, covered
New Hampshire
Bridges, covered